Somerville may refer to:

Places
Somerville, Victoria, Australia
Somerville, Western Australia, a suburb of Kalgoorlie, Australia
Somerville, New Zealand, a suburb of Manukau City, New Zealand

United States 
Somerville, Alabama
Somerville (Kenton, Delaware), a historic house
Somerville, Indiana
Somerville, Maine
Somerville, Massachusetts
Somerville, New Jersey
Somerville Circle, a traffic circle near Somerville, New Jersey
Somerville, Ohio
Somerville, Queens, a neighborhood located in Arverne, Queens in New York City
Somerville, Tennessee
Somerville, Texas
Somerville Lake, a reservoir near Somerville, Texas

Other uses
Somerville (surname)
Somerville (crater), a crater in the eastern part of the Moon
Somerville (video game), a 2022 game from Jumpship
Somerville College, Oxford, a constituent college of the University of Oxford
Somerville College Boat Club, the rowing club of Somerville College, Oxford
Somerville Theatre, a movie theatre and concert venue in Massachusetts
Somerville Auditorium, an outdoor cinema at the University of Western Australia.

See also
Somervell, a surname
Somersville (disambiguation)
Sommerville (disambiguation)
Summerville (disambiguation)